Haripada Baguli (1900 - 1990) was an Indian politician, and a member of West Bengal Legislative Assembly from the Sagar constituency, as a member of the Kisan Mazdoor Praja Party. He was elected in the 1952 West Bengal Legislative Assembly election and served until 1957. He later stood as a candidate of the Praja Socialist Party for the Kakdwip constituency in the 1957 and 1962 elections, but lost both times.

Electoral history

References

1900 births
1990 deaths
West Bengal MLAs 1951–1957
Kisan Mazdoor Praja Party politicians
Praja Socialist Party politicians